Marian Żelazek (1918–2006) was a Polish Roman Catholic priest of the Society of the Divine Word (SVD), who lived in India and served amongst people of Orrisa. He is remembered for his service and care towards the lepers in the region. He was the last foreign missionary of the SVD congregation in India. He was declared Servant of God on 25 August 2018.

Early life 
Marian Żelazek was born on 30 January 1918 in Paledzie, Poznan, Poland to Mr. Stanislaw and Mrs. Stanislawa. He joined the Society of the Divine Word in 1937. He made his first profession as a member of the society on 4 September 1939. He completed his philosophy in Poland and Theology from Pontifical Athenaeum of Saint Anselm.

Priesthood 
Żelazek made his final profession on 8 September 1948 and was ordained a priest on 18 September 1948. His priestly formation was interrupted for five years because he was captured  by the Wehrmacht for being a Catholic seminarian and a polish citizen. He spent five years in a concentration camp at Dachau in Germany, along with his fellow seminarians, priests and brothers.

On 21 May 1950, Żelazek reached Orissa, India. He was headmaster of the Hamirpur boys high school and director of the Minor seminary in Hamirpur. He set up many schools and hostels and promoted education in Rourkela, Orissa. He served in Orissa for 25 years. He persuaded the state government to give recognition to the catholic run schools in the state.

In 1975, he was transferred to Puri as a parish priest. He remained parish priest of Puri from 1975 to 1991. He was so moved by the sight of so many lepers in the nearby temple that he started a house to take care of them. He named the house Karunalaya. He moved to an ashram in Ishopathy after handing over the charge of parish priest to another priest. He also set up St. Arnold's Center of Spirituality.

Awards and honors 
In August 2000, the Polish government conferred on Żelazek its highest national civilian awards The Chivalry Cross of Order of the Rebirth of Poland. City Council of Poznan awarded him the tribute of The Honored Citizen of Poznan on 29 June 2005. On 5 March 2003, he was awarded The Sir Jehangir Ghandy Medal by  the Xavier Labour Institute of Jamshedpur, Bihar. The Neelchakra socio-cultural organization of Orissa honored him with “Neelchakra”.  Oriya daily newspaper Samaj presented him with the Dr. Radhanath Rath Seva Samman Award and a cash prize of Rupees. 10,000.00 on 6 December 2005. He was also nominated for the Nobel Peace Prize in 2001 and 2003 for his work for the lepers. BBC broadcast a 45-minute video documentary titled “The New Face of Leprosy”.

Death 
Zelazek died of a cardiac arrest on 30 April 2006. On 2 May 2006 after the funeral mass  at the St. Arnold's Church, Jharsuguda, he was buried at the SVD cemetery in the premises of the SVD Provincial House in Jharsuguda.

Beatification process 
On 25 August 2018 he was declared Servant of God by the diocese and hence started the process of his canonisation.

See also 
List of saints of India

References 

1918 births
Servants of God
Divine Word Missionaries Order
2006 deaths
Pontifical Atheneum of St. Anselm alumni
Polish Roman Catholic priests
Roman Catholic missionaries in India
21st-century venerated Christians